Chilorhinophis gerardi, commonly known as Gerard's black and yellow burrowing snake or Gerard's two-headed snake, is a species of venomous snake in the family Atractaspididae. The species is endemic to Africa.

Etymology
The specific name, gerardi, is in honor of Belgian physician and naturalist Pol Gérard (1886-1961) who collected the type specimen.

Geographic range
C. gerardi is found in southern Democratic Republic of the Congo (formerly known as Zaire), Tanzania, Zambia, and Zimbabwe.

Subspecies
Two subspecies of C. gerardi are recognized as being valid, including the nominotypical subspecies.
Chilorhinophis gerardi gerardi 
Chilorhinophis gerardi tanganyikae 

Nota bene: A trinomial authority in parentheses indicates that the subspecies was originally described in a genus other than Chilorhinophis.

References

Further reading
Barbour T, Amaral A (1927). "Studies on African Ophidia". Bull. Antivenin Inst. America 1 (1): 25–27.
Boulenger GA (1913). "Description de deux reptiles nouveaux provenant du Katanga ". Revue Zoologique Africaine 3: 103–105. (Apostolepis gerardi, new species, pp. 103–104, Figure). (in French).
Branch, Bill (2004). Field Guide to Snakes and other Reptiles of Southern Africa. Sanibel Island, Florida: Ralph Curtis Books. 399 pp. . (Chilorhinophis gerardi, p. 67 + Plate 24).
Loveridge A (1951). "On Reptiles and Amphibians from Tanganyika Territory Collected by C. J. P. Ionides". Bull. Mus. Comp. Zoöl., Harvard 106 (4): 175–204. (Chilorhinophis gerardi tanganyikae, new subspecies, pp. 195–196).

Atractaspididae
Reptiles described in 1913